Em Busca de Iara is a 2013 Brazilian documentary film directed by Flavio Frederico about the guerrilla Iara Iavelberg, a woman who participated in the armed struggle against the dictatorship in Brazil. With the research of documents, archive footage and interviews, the documentary reconstructs the life of Iara and disassembles the official version, which assigns her death to suicide.

References

Brazilian documentary films
Films about Brazilian military dictatorship
2013 documentary films
2013 films
Documentary films about revolutionaries
Documentary films about women
Documentary films about Latin American military dictatorships
Documentary films about women in war